Maris is a surname with many origins. In Britain, the name (including De Maris) may be of Old French origin (see Marais (surname)) Both the Greek and Dutch surnames can be matronymics from "Maria". The name can also represent respellings: the American baseball player Roger Maris was born with the Croatian name Maras, while the Dutch painting brothers Jacob, Matthijs and Willem Maris were grandchildren of Wenzel Maresch of Bohemia. People with the surname Maris include:

Ada Maris (born 1957), Mexican-American actress
Albert Branson Maris (1893–1989), United States federal judge
Bart Maris (born 1965), Belgian trumpet player
Bernard Maris (1946–2015), French economist, writer and journalist
Bill Maris, American entrepreneur
Demetris Maris (born 1979), Greek footballer
Ellen van Maris (born 1958), Dutch bodybuilder
George Maris (born 1996), English football midfielder
Georgios Maris (1882–1949), Greek politician, minister of the interior 1923/1933
Humphrey Maris (born 1939), British physicist
Hyllus Maris (1933–1986), Aboriginal Australian activist, poet and educator
Jacob Maris (1837–1899), Dutch painter, brother of Willem and Matthijs
Matthijs Maris (1839–1917), Dutch painter, etcher and lithographer, brother of Willem and Jacob
Merrill De Maris (1898–1948), American writer who worked on Disney Comic Strips
Mona Maris (1903–1991), Argentine film actress
Peter Maris (born 1950s), Greek-born American film director and producer 
Roger Maris (1934–1985), American baseball player
Simon Maris (1873–1935), Dutch painter and art dealer, son of Willem
Willem Maris (1844–1910), Dutch landscape painter of the Hague School, brother of Matthijs and Jacob

In legend and fiction:
Hector de Maris, Knight of the Round Table in Arthurian legend
Nicole Maris, a major character in the 1999 film Drive Me Crazy

References

Dutch-language surnames
Greek-language surnames
Surnames
Matronymic surnames